Birds of a Feather is a Silly Symphonies animated Disney short film. It was released on February 10, 1931, by Columbia Pictures.

Plot
Swans swim by, a peacock displays its plumage in glorious black-and-white, a passing duck jeers, assorted songbirds chirp, a woodpecker chases a caterpillar, and a chorus of owls croon. A chicken goes after worms while ignoring her brood until a hawk circles. When the hawk captures one chick, the crows form an attack squadron.

Voice cast
 Florence Gill: Hen, assorted squawks and bird whistles
 Purv Pullen And Marion Darlington: Bird Whistles
 Toby Wing: Baby Chicks
 The Rhythmettes (including Dorothy Compton, Beatrice Hagen, and Mary Moder): Hummingbirds and Brox Sister owls

Comic adaptation
The Silly Symphony Sunday comic strip ran a three-month-long adaptation of Birds of a Feather from March 11 to June 17, 1934.

Reception
Variety (April 15, 1931): "This subject suffers from too much similarity with previous cartoons of this and other series... This weakness makes it filler stuff for the intermediate programs and lesser spots only. It's a concoction of rhythmic gyration by various fowl."

Home media
The short was released on December 4, 2001, on Walt Disney Treasures: Silly Symphonies - The Historic Musical Animated Classics.

References

External links
 

1931 films
1931 short films
1930s Disney animated short films
Silly Symphonies
1931 animated films
Films directed by Burt Gillett
Films produced by Walt Disney
Animated films about birds
American black-and-white films
Columbia Pictures short films
Columbia Pictures animated short films
Animated films about animals
Animated films without speech
1930s American films